Muriel Denison, née Jessie Muriel Goggin (1886–1954), was a Canadian writer.

Born in Winnipeg, Manitoba, she was educated at Havergal College, Edgehill School, and the Royal Conservatory of Music (Toronto). In 1926 she married author and playwright Merrill Denison.

Denison is best known as the author of the "Susannah" novels, a series of books set in the years 1896–1900, and featuring Susannah Winston, age 9-13: Susannah of the Mounties, Susannah of the Yukon, Susannah at Boarding School, and Susannah Rides Again. The first book was the inspiration for the Shirley Temple movie of the same name, though the two stories are very different.

Denison often wrote nonfiction using the pen name "Frances Newton" for articles in This Week, Reader's Digest, McCall's and other magazines.

Denison lived in New York for 20 years before her death, but returned to Toronto to go to hospital and died there.

References

The Globe and Mail, 23 September 1954.

External links
 

1886 births
1954 deaths
20th-century Canadian novelists
20th-century Canadian women writers
Canadian women novelists
The Royal Conservatory of Music alumni
Writers from Winnipeg
Pseudonymous women writers
20th-century pseudonymous writers